Sambuco is a comune (municipality) in the Province of Cuneo in the Italian region Piedmont, located about  southwest of Turin and about  west of Cuneo.

Sambuco borders the following municipalities: Canosio, Demonte, Marmora, Pietraporzio, and Vinadio.

Demographic evolution

See also
Comune

References

Cities and towns in Piedmont